Petre Grigoraș (born 15 November 1964, in Poduri, Bacău) is a Romanian football manager and former player. He is known as "Petre Grigoraș, cel mai tare din oraș" ("Petre Grigoraș, best man of the city"), as his career as a manager was very appreciated when he led Oțelul Galați. At Pandurii Târgu Jiu he coached his son Alexandru, who plays a striker.

Honours

Player
Levski Sofia
Bulgarian League: 1993–94

Manager
Farul Constanța
Romanian Cup Finalist: 2004–05
Liga III: 2017–18

Oțelul Galați
UEFA Intertoto Cup: 2007
Liga III: 2020–21

Pandurii Târgu Jiu
Romanian League Runner-up: 2012–13

References

External links
 

1964 births
Living people
People from Bacău County
Romanian footballers
FCM Bacău players
FC Steaua București players
FCV Farul Constanța players
PFC Dobrudzha Dobrich players
PFC Levski Sofia players
PFC Lokomotiv Plovdiv players
FC Universitatea Cluj players
Liga I players
First Professional Football League (Bulgaria) players
Romanian expatriate footballers
Expatriate footballers in Bulgaria
Romanian expatriate sportspeople in Bulgaria
Romanian football managers
FCV Farul Constanța managers
ASC Oțelul Galați managers
CS Pandurii Târgu Jiu managers
CFR Cluj managers
ACS Poli Timișoara managers
ASA 2013 Târgu Mureș managers
ACS Foresta Suceava managers
Association football forwards